Hao Ping (born 15 September 1959) is a Chinese historian and academic administrator who has served as the party secretary of Peking University since June 2022. He served as president of Peking University from 2018 to 2022, Chinese vice minister of education from 2009 to 2016, and president of Beijing Foreign Studies University from 2005 to 2009.

Education 
Hao Ping received a Bachelor of History with a major in history from Peking University in 1982, a Master of Arts in history from the University of Hawaiʻi in 1995, and a (on-the-job) Doctor of Laws in international relations from Peking University in 1999.

Curriculum vitae 
 1978-1982　Undergraduate studies (Bachelor of History), Peking University
 1982-1986　Staff member in office of the President, Peking University
 1986-1991　Deputy Director , Office of Student Affairs, Peking University
 1991-1992　Visiting Scholar, Center for Chinese Studies, University of Hawaii, USA
 1992-1995　Postgraduate studies (M.A. in History), University of Hawaiʻi
 1995-2001　Concurrently served as Director of Office of International Programs, Assistant President of PKU (1997.04), Deputy Secretary-General of PKU Education Foundation (1998.09), and Executive Member of the CPC Standing Committee of PKU (1999.02)
 1995-1999　Doctoral studies (LL.D. in international relations), Peking University
 2001-2005　Vice President of Peking University and Executive Member of the CPC Standing Committee of PKU
 2005-2009　President, Beijing Foreign Studies University
 2009-　Vice Minister of Education, Executive Member of the CPC Leading Group of Ministry of Education, Director of Chinese National Commission for UNESCO

Hao is a Deputy to the National Committee of the 11th Chinese People’s Political Consultative Conference.

Publications 
 Hao Ping,  [An Unfortunate Ending: John Leighton Stuart and China]. (Peking University Press, 2011).
 Hao Ping, Sun Yat-sen and America (Foreign Language Teaching & Research Press, 2012).
 Hao Ping, Peking University and the Origins of Higher Education in China ([Peking University Press, 2nd ed., 2008] Bridge21 Publications, 2013).

References

Chinese Communist Party politicians from Shandong
Peking University alumni
1959 births
Living people
People's Republic of China politicians from Shandong
Presidents of Peking University
Presidents of Beijing Foreign Studies University
Academic staff of Peking University
Academic staff of Beijing Foreign Studies University
Educators from Shandong
People's Republic of China historians
Historians from Shandong
Politicians from Qingdao
Alternate members of the 19th Central Committee of the Chinese Communist Party
21st-century Chinese historians
Writers from Qingdao